KXFT (99.7 FM, "Sunny 99.7") is a radio station broadcasting an adult contemporary format. Licensed to Manson, Iowa, United States, the station serves Fort Dodge, Iowa. The station is currently owned by Alpha Media, through licensee Alpha 3E Licensee LLC.

History
KXFT signed on in November 2007 with a Top 40 (CHR) format as "99X". On July 31, 2009, at 5:00PM CDT, the station changed to an adult contemporary format as "Sunny 99.7" as the Top 40 (CHR) format was moved to sister station KKEZ "Mix 94.5", which was previously adult contemporary.

References

External links

XFT
Mainstream adult contemporary radio stations in the United States
Webster County, Iowa
Radio stations established in 2007
Alpha Media radio stations